Mstislav of Kiev may refer to:

 Mstislav I of Kiev  (1076 – 1132) 
 Mstislav II of Kiev  (died 1172)
 Mstislav III of Kiev (died 1223)